Dying is the experience of death. 

Dying may also refer to:

 Dying (song), by XTC
 "Dying", a song by Hole from Celebrity Skin
 "Dying", a song by Mavado from Gangsta for Life: The Symphony of David Brooks
 "Dying", a song by Obituary from Cause of Death
 "Dying", a song by Stone Sour from Audio Secrecy
 "Dying - I Only Feel Apathy", a song by Theatre of Tragedy from Theatre of Tragedy

See also
 Dyeing, the process of coloring cloth and clothing